Blossom Dearie is an album by Blossom Dearie that was recorded in 1956 and released in 1957. It was her first recording for Verve.

Background
Dearie recorded for the Barclay label in 1955 and 1956. This eponymous album was her next recording as a leader.

Reception
In a positive retrospective review written for the CD release, AllMusic reviewer Scott Yanow praises Dearie's voice, writing its "sincerity and sense of swing wins one over after a few songs" and her "piano playing is first class".

In 2019, record club Vinyl Me, Please. reissued the album on vinyl. This was the first time the album was re-issued onto vinyl in the United States since its release.

Track listings
"'Deed I Do" (Walter Hirsch, Fred Rose) – 2:11
"Lover Man (Oh Where Can You Be?)" (Jimmy Davis, Ram Ramirez, Jimmy Sherman) – 2:45
"Ev'rything I've Got" (Richard Rodgers, Lorenz Hart) – 2:27
"Comment allez-vous" (Murray Grand) – 2:10
"More Than You Know" (Edward Eliscu, Rose, Vincent Youmans) – 3:25
"Thou Swell" (Rodgers, Hart) – 2:59
"It Might as Well Be Spring" (Rodgers, Oscar Hammerstein II) (sung in French) – 3:09
"Tout doucement" (Emile Jean Mercadier, Rene Albert Clausier) – 2:21
"You for Me" (Bob Haymes) – 2:13
"Now at Last" (Haymes) – 3:20
"I Hear Music" (Burton Lane, Frank Loesser) – 2:05
"Wait Till You See Her" (Rodgers, Hart) – 3:19
"I Won't Dance" (Dorothy Fields, Hammerstein, Otto Harbach, Jerome Kern, Jimmy McHugh) – 2:44
"A Fine Spring Morning" (Haymes) – 3:04
CD reissue bonus tracks not included on the original 1957 release
"They Say It's Spring" (Marty Clark, Haymes) – 3:22
"Johnny One Note" (Rodgers, Hart) – 2:10
"Blossom's Blues" (Blossom Dearie) – 3:09

Personnel
Blossom Dearie – piano, vocals
Herb Ellis – guitar
Ray Brown – double bass
Jo Jones – drums

References

1957 albums
Albums produced by Blossom Dearie
Albums produced by Norman Granz
Blossom Dearie albums
Verve Records albums